Dante Cicchetti is a developmental psychology and developmental psychopathology scientist, specializing in high-risk and disenfranchised populations, including maltreated children and offspring of depressed parents. He currently holds a joint appointment in the department of psychiatry at the University of Minnesota Medical School and in the Institute of Child Development. He is the McKnight Presidential Endowed Chair and the William Harris Endowed Chair.

Biography 
Cicchetti received his Bachelor of Science degree from the University of Pittsburgh, and a Philosophy of Doctor degree from the University of Minnesota in 1972 in clinical psychology and developmental psychology. He was on the faculty of Harvard University from 1977 to 1985, where he was the Norman Tishman Associate Professor of Psychology. In 1985, he left for the University of Rochester where was the director of the Mt. Hope Family Center. Cicchetti is the founding and current editor of the academic journal Development and Psychopathology.

Career
While at Harvard, he began publishing research on emotional development, Down Syndrome, child maltreatment, and the development of conditions such as depression and borderline personality disorder. In 1984, he edited a special issue of Child Development on developmental psychopathology to acquaint the developmental community with this emerging discipline.

Cicchetti's primary research interests lie in formulating an integrative developmental theory that describes and explains the full range of human psychological functioning. His work has involved several domains, including developmental psychopathology, the developmental consequences of child maltreatment, neuroplasticity, and sensitive periods. Additionally, he has researched the impact of traumatic experiences on brain development, the biology and psychology of unipolar and bipolar mood disorders, the interrelationships among molecular, genetic, neurobiological, socio-emotional, cognitive, linguistic, and representational development in normal and pathological populations, the study of attachment relations and representational models of the self and its disorders across the life span, and multilevel perspectives on resilience.

Cicchetti's research has been funded by the National Institute of Mental Health, the National Institute of Drug Abuse, the Office of Child Abuse and Neglect, and the William T. Grant Foundation.

Professional societies
 Fellow, The American Association for the Advancement of Science (AAAS)
 Fellow, Association for Psychological Science

Selected works
 Cicchetti, D., & Rogosch, F. A. (2012). Gene by Environment interaction and resilience: Effects of child maltreatment and serotonin, corticotropin releasing hormone, dopamine, and oxytocin genes. Development and Psychopathology, 24(2).
 Cicchetti, D., Rogosch, F. A., & Oshri, A. (2011). Interactive effects of corticotropin releasing hormone receptor 1, serotonin transporter linked polymorphic region, and child maltreatment on diurnal cortisol regulation and internalizing symptomatology. Development and Psychopathology, 23, 1125–1138.
 Cicchetti, D. (2010). Resilience under conditions of extreme stress: A multilevel perspective [Special Article]. World Psychiatry, 9, 1–10.
 Cicchetti, D., Rogosch, F. A., Toth, S. L., & Sturge-Apple, M. L. (2011). Normalizing the development of cortisol regulation in maltreated infants through preventive interventions. Development and Psychopathology, 23, 789–800.
 Cicchetti, D. (2004). An odyssey of discovery: Lessons learned through three decades of research on child maltreatment. American Psychologist, 59(8), 4–14.
 Cicchetti, D., & Rogosch, F. (1999). Psychopathology as risk for adolescent substance use disorders: A developmental psychopathology perspective. Journal of Clinical Child Psychiatry, 28, 355–365.

Books edited
 Cicchetti, D., & Cohen, D. J. (Eds.). (2006). Developmental psychopathology: Theory and method (Vol. 1, 2nd ed.). New York: Wiley.
 Cicchetti, D., & Cohen, D. J. (Eds.). (2006). Developmental psychopathology: Developmental neuroscience (Vol. 2, 2nd ed.). New York: Wiley.
 Cicchetti, D., & Cohen, D. J. (Eds.). (2006). Developmental psychopathology: Risk, disorder, and adaptation. (Vol. 3, 2nd ed.). New York: Wiley.
 Attachment in the Preschool Years: Theory, Research, and Intervention by Dante Cicchetti, Mark T. Greenberg, E. Mark Cummings.  (0-226-30630-5).
 Child Maltreatment: Theory and Research on the Causes and Consequences of Child Abuse and Neglect by Dante Cicchetti, Vicki K. Carlson.  (0-521-37969-5). Cambridge University Press.
 Cicchetti, D., & Cohen, D. J. (Eds.). (1995). Developmental psychopathology: Theory and method (Vol. 1). New York: Wiley.
 Cicchetti, D., & Cohen, D. J. (Eds.). (1995). Developmental psychopathology: Risk, disorder, and adaptation (Vol. 2). New York: Wiley.

References

External links
 The Institute of Child Development at the University of Minnesota Institute of Child Development
 Champion of Psychology: Champions of Psychology: Dante Cicchetti
 Mt. Hope Family Center Mt. Hope Family Center | Building strong families through scientific research.

21st-century American psychologists
Living people
University of Minnesota faculty
University of Minnesota College of Liberal Arts alumni
University of Pittsburgh alumni
Fellows of the American Association for the Advancement of Science
Year of birth missing (living people)